Marshal of Armoured Troops Mikhail Yefimovich Katukov (   – 8 June 1976) served as a commander of  armored troops in the Red Army during and following World War II. He is viewed as one of the most talented Soviet armor commanders. Mikhail Katukov holds the honor of the first major victory of the Soviet armored forces, the victory from October 4 to October 11, 1941 at Mtsensk over the 3rd and 4th tank divisions, which were part of the Guderian's Panzergruppe 2 in the Battle of Moscow. His other notable command during the German-Soviet War were that of 1st Guards Tank Army, which he commanded during the Battle of Kursk (1943), the  Proskurov-Chernovtsy Operation (1944), the Lvov-Sandomierz Operation (1944), the Vistula Oder Operation (1945), and the Battle of Berlin (1945). He commanded 1st Guards Tank Brigade during the Battle of Moscow (1941), and 3rd Mechanised Corps
during Operation Mars (1942).

Early life 
From a young age he worked on the local landowner's dairy farm. Katukov graduated from a rural primary school. In 1912, sent to relatives in Saint Petersburg, he worked as a messenger boy in a dairy shop, and later in the factories of the city. Katukov participated in the October Revolution in 1917, after which he returned to Bolshoe Uvaravo to take care of his family after his mother's death.

Military career
Katukov enlisted to the Red Army as a private in 1919. He served during the Russian Civil War, and later served as a tank formation commander before the war.  In 1935 he graduated from the Stalin Military Academy and in July 1936 he was promoted to captain. In October 1938 came his first major command as acting commanding officer of the 5th Light Tank Brigade of the 45th Mechanized Corps. He survived the purges.

Second World War
On the onset of the war he took command of the 4th Tank Brigade. In the battle of Moscow in 1941, it was Katukov's Tank Brigade, then part of the 1st Guards Rifle Corps, that checked the advance of Guderian's Panzergruppe 2 near Tula. To honor this achievement it became the 1st Guards Tank Brigade. 

On November 11, 1941, Order No. 337 of the People's Commissar of Defense of the USSR appeared, which, in particular, stated:

"The 4th Tank Brigade, with brave and skillful combat actions from 04.10.1941. to 11.10.1941., despite the significant numerical superiority of the enemy, inflicted heavy losses on him and fulfilled the tasks assigned to the brigade to cover the concentration of our troops… As a result of the fierce battles of the brigade with the 3rd and 4th tank divisions and the enemy's motorized division, the fascists lost 133 tanks, 49 guns, 8 aircraft, 15 tractors with ammunition, up to an infantry regiment, 6 mortars and other weapons. The losses of the 4th Tank Brigade are calculated in several units." 

Although a later study of captured German documents showed that the number of German tank losses was significantly overstated in this order, and the losses in the tanks of the 4th Brigade as a result of the seven-day battles were generally comparable to the German ones, but the fact that the German offensive was suspended by smaller forces in the direction of the main strike was of great importance.

For these exploits, the 4th Tank Brigade was the first in the Red Army to receive the honorary title of "Guards", the Guards banner and the new military formation became known as the 1st Guards Tank Brigade. Within its ranks from September 1941 fought the most productive Soviet and allied tank ace Dmitry Lavrinenko.

Later during Operation Mars in December 1942, Katukov's command managed a deep penetration into the German lines in Rzhev. In January 1943 he took command of the 1st Guards Tank Army, a post he held for the duration of the war.

In the battle of Kursk, Katukov's command was one of the two armies that were hardest-hit by the initial German advance on the southern shoulder.  Through the use of well-defended and sited strong-points, dug in tanks, and judicious use of counterattacks, Katukov managed to extract a high toll from the German attackers breaking through the defensive system.

He commanded his tank army in the Proskurov-Chernovtsy Operation, Lvov–Sandomierz Offensive, the Vistula–Oder Offensive, and the Battle of Berlin.

Mikhail Katukov was awarded the title of the Hero of the Soviet Union twice (23 September 1944 and 6 April 1945).

Post-War
Following the war he became commander of the mechanized forces of the Group of Soviet Forces in Germany, and later Inspector General of the Army.

In popular culture
In the 1970 film Patton, Katukov is portrayed drinking a toast with General Patton to celebrate their armies' mutual victory over Nazi Germany.

Awards and honors

Soviet Union

Foreign

References

External links

Generals.dk

1900 births
1976 deaths
People from Moscow Oblast
People from Kolomensky Uyezd
Communist Party of the Soviet Union members
Soviet Marshals of Tank Troops
Russian people of World War II
Soviet military personnel of World War II
Heroes of the Soviet Union
Recipients of the Order of Lenin
Recipients of the Order of the Red Banner
Recipients of the Order "For Service to the Homeland in the Armed Forces of the USSR", 3rd class
Recipients of the Order of Suvorov, 1st class
Recipients of the Order of Kutuzov, 1st class
Recipients of the Order of Bogdan Khmelnitsky (Soviet Union), 1st class
Recipients of the Order of Kutuzov, 2nd class
Commanders of the Order of Polonia Restituta
Knights of the Virtuti Militari
Recipients of the Order of the Cross of Grunwald, 2nd class
Companions of the Distinguished Service Order
Recipients of the Patriotic Order of Merit
Burials at Novodevichy Cemetery